Tempisque Conservation Area is an administrative area which is managed by SINAC for the purposes of conservation in the western part of Costa Rica, including the Tempisque River valley and the Nicoya Peninsula. It contains a number of National Parks, Wildlife refuges and Forest Reserves.

Geography 
It is located in the northwestern part of Costa Rica. It includes the Nicoya Peninsula.

Protected areas
 Barra Honda National Park
 Cabo Blanco Absolute Natural Reserve
 Cabo Blanco Marine Management Area
 Caletas-Ario Mixed Wildlife Refuge
 Camaronal Wildlife Refuge
 Cañas River Lacustrine Wetland
 Chora Island Wildlife Refuge
 Cipancí Wildlife Refuge
 Conchal Wildlife Refuge
 Corral de Piedra Palustrine Wetland
 Curú Wildlife Refuge
 Diriá National Park
 Guayabo Island Biological Reserve
 Iguanita Wildlife Refuge
 La Cruz Hill Protected Zone
 Las Baulas de Guanacaste Protected Zone
 Las Baulas Marine National Park
 Mata Redonda Wildlife Refuge
 Monte Alto Protected Zone
 Negritos Islands Biological Reserve
 Nicolas Wessberg Absolute Natural Reserve
 Nicoya Peninsula Protected Zone
 Ostional Mixed Wildlife Refuge
 Romelia Wildlife Refuge
 Werner Sauter Wildlife Refuge
 Zapandí Riverine Wetlands

References 

Conservation Areas of Costa Rica